Syrittosyrphus is a genus of hoverflies from the family Syrphidae, in the order Diptera.

Species
Syrittosyrphus opacea Hull, 1944

References

Diptera of Africa
Hoverfly genera
Eristalinae
Taxa named by Frank Montgomery Hull